Machilipatnam Municipal Corporation is the civic body that governs the city of Machilipatnam in the Indian state of Andhra Pradesh. Machilipatnam was upgraded to corporation, but it continues to be a municipality till the expiry of its present elected council. Municipal Corporation mechanism in India was introduced during British Rule with formation of municipal corporation in Madras (Chennai) in 1688, later followed by municipal corporations in Bombay (Mumbai) and Calcutta (Kolkata) by 1762. Machilipatnam Municipal Corporation is headed by Mayor of city and governed by Commissioner.

Jurisdiction 

It was constituted as a municipality in the year 1866 and was upgraded to corporation from special grade municipality on 9 December 2015.

2021 elections

Administration 

The corporation is administered by an elected body, headed by the Mayor. The corporation population as per the 2011 Census of India was 169,892. The present commissioner of the corporation is Chandraiah and the municipal chair person is Moka venkateswaramma.

Functions 
Machilipatnam Municipal Corporation is created for the following functions:

 Planning for the town including its surroundings which are covered under its Department's Urban Planning Authority .

 Approving construction of new buildings and authorising use of land for various purposes.

 Improvement of the town's economic and Social status.

 Arrangements of water supply towards commercial,residential and industrial purposes.

 Planning for fire contingencies through Fire Service Departments.

 Creation of solid waste management,public health system and sanitary services.

 Working for the development of ecological aspect like development of Urban Forestry and making guidelines for environmental protection.

 Working for the development of weaker sections of the society like mentally and physically handicapped,old age and gender biased people.

 Making efforts for improvement of slums and poverty removal in the town.

Revenue sources 

The following are the Income sources for the Corporation from the Central and State Government.

Revenue from taxes  
Following is the Tax related revenue for the corporation.

 Property tax.
 Profession tax.
 Entertainment tax.
 Grants from Central and State Government like Goods and Services Tax.
 Advertisement tax.

Revenue from non-tax sources 

Following is the Non Tax related revenue for the corporation.

 Water usage charges.
 Fees from Documentation services.
 Rent received from municipal property.
 Funds from municipal bonds.

Revenue from taxes  
Following is the Tax related revenue for the corporation.

 Property tax.
 Profession tax.
 Entertainment tax.
 Grants from Central and State Government like Goods and Services Tax.
 Advertisement tax.

Revenue from non-tax sources 

Following is the Non Tax related revenue for the corporation.

 Water usage charges.
 Fees from Documentation services.
 Rent received from municipal property.
 Funds from municipal bonds.

Awards and achievements
In 2015, as per the Swachh Bharat Abhiyan of the Ministry of Urban Development, Machilipatnam Municipal Corporation was ranked 301st in the country.

References

Municipal corporations in Andhra Pradesh
Year of establishment missing
Machilipatnam